Group C of the 2008 Rugby League World Cup was one of the three groups of teams that competed in the 2008 Rugby League World Cup tournament's group stage. Group C consisted of three teams: Ireland, Tonga and Samoa. After all teams played had each other once, only Ireland advanced to 2008 Rugby League World Cup knockout stage.

Standings
In the knockout stage Ireland played in the qualifying final while Tonga and Samoa played for 7th and 9th place respectively.

Matches

Tonga vs Ireland

Samoa vs Tonga

Ireland vs Samoa

References

Group C